John Grover Malone (November 12, 1895 – December 11, 1950) was a player in the National Football League.

Biography
Malone was born on November 12, 1895 in Chicago, Illinois. He died on December 11, 1950 in South Bend, Indiana.

Career
Malone played with the Chicago Tigers during the 1920 NFL season. He would split the following season between the Green Bay Packers and the Rock Island Independents. After a season away from the NFL, he played with the Akron Pros during the 1923 NFL season.

He coached Loyola Academy to a 7-1-1 record in 1920 and a 5-1-2 record in 1921.

He played at the collegiate level at the University of Notre Dame.

See also
List of Chicago Tigers players
List of Green Bay Packers players
List of Rock Island Independents players
List of Akron Pros players

References

External links

1895 births
1950 deaths
Players of American football from Chicago
Chicago Tigers players
Green Bay Packers players
Rock Island Independents players
Akron Pros players
University of Notre Dame alumni
Notre Dame Fighting Irish football players